The Eastern Kentucky Colonels are the intercollegiate athletic teams of Eastern Kentucky University (EKU), located in Richmond, Kentucky, in intercollegiate sports as a member of the NCAA Division I ranks, primarily competing in the ASUN Conference since the 2021–22 academic year; while its football team competes in the Western Athletic Conference (WAC) until the ASUN launches its own football league, most likely in the 2022 fall season. The Colonels previously competed in the Ohio Valley Conference (OVC) from 1948–49 to 2020–21.

Overview
The Colonels athletic program competes in NCAA Division I as a member of the ASUN Conference. The football team plays in the second level of Division I football, the Football Championship Subdivision (FCS). Before joining the ASUN in July 2021, EKU had spent the previous 73 years as a charter member of the Ohio Valley Conference (OVC).  The EKU mascot is The Colonel, and the school colors are maroon and white. While the women's teams were formerly known as the Lady Colonels, the school now emphasizes that all teams are now Colonels.

Although EKU's new home of the ASUN does not currently sponsor football, it has committed to launching an FCS football league in the near future. Until ASUN football is established, EKU football competes as a de facto associate member of the Western Athletic Conference (WAC), competing in a football partnership between the two leagues officially branded as the "ASUN–WAC Challenge".

Varsity teams
EKU's intercollegiate athletics teams are nicknamed the Colonels. Maroon has been the official color of Eastern athletics since the school was begun as the Eastern Kentucky State Normal School in 1906, and the school's official team nickname was the "Maroons" from the start of intercollegiate competition in 1909–10 until 1963, when then-president Robert Martin changed the nickname to the "Colonels".

A member of the ASUN Conference since July 2021, Eastern Kentucky University sponsors teams in eight men's and nine women's NCAA sanctioned sports.

EKU competes in 18 intercollegiate varsity sports: Men's sports include baseball, basketball, cross country, football, golf, tennis and track & field; while women's sports include basketball, beach volleyball, cross country, golf, soccer, softball, tennis, track & field and volleyball.

Football

Eastern has traditionally been quite successful on the football field, having won 20 OVC titles and two Division I-AA National Championships in 1979 and 1982. Much of the success came during the long tenure of head coach Roy Kidd from 1964 to 2002. In 1990, Eastern honored Kidd by naming the school's football stadium Roy Kidd Stadium. With their win over Southeast Missouri State University in 2008, Eastern's football team secured their 31st consecutive winning season. The team is currently coached by Walt Wells, former assistant head coach at Eastern and most recently a quality control assistant at the University of Kentucky.

In September 2013, the Lexington Herald-Leader, the daily newspaper of nearby Lexington, reported that EKU was considering moving its program to the top-level Football Bowl Subdivision. However, under NCAA rules, such a move would require that EKU first receive an all-sports invitation from an existing FBS conference. In the end, no such move was made.

As noted previously, EKU football is now a WAC member on a temporary basis until the ASUN launches its own football league.

Conference championships

Men's basketball
The current head coach of the Colonels is A. W. Hamilton.

The Colonels have appeared in the NCAA tournament seven times. The Colonels play their home basketball games at Alumni Coliseum, located on EKU's campus.

Men's golf
The men's golf team has won 12 Ohio Valley Conference championships: 1975, 1980, 1982–86, 1992, 1997, 2006, 2008, 2015.

Rivalries
Historically, the Western Kentucky Hilltoppers and Lady Toppers served as the primary rival to EKU, especially in football.  Their matchups, known as the "Battle of the Bluegrass," date back to 1914, with Western leading the overall series 34–47–3.  With WKU's recent move up to the Football Bowl Subdivision, any future games between the two teams are uncertain.

Outside of Western, EKU has maintained rivalries with the two remaining in-state OVC members of Murray State and Morehead State.

Facilities

References

External links
 

 
Colonels